Kabi Sukanta Mahavidyalaya, established in 1986, is a general degree college in Bhadreswar. It offers undergraduate courses in Arts and Commerce. The campus is in the Hooghly district. It is affiliated to  University of Burdwan.

Departments (Under Graduate)

Arts

Bengali ( Hons.)
English ( Hons.)
Mathematics
Sanskrit ( Hons.)
History ( Hons.)
Geography ( Hons.)
Political Science ( Hons.)
Economics
Education ( Hons.)
Sociology ( Hons.)
Philosophy

Commerce 
Accountancy

Science (Stream Coming Very Soon!)

Accreditation
Recently, Kabi Sukanta Mahavidyalaya has been awarded B grade by the National Assessment and Accreditation Council (NAAC). The college is also recognized by the University Grants Commission (UGC).

See also

References

External links
 Kabi Sukanta Mahavidyalaya

Colleges affiliated to University of Burdwan
Educational institutions established in 1986
Universities and colleges in Hooghly district
1986 establishments in West Bengal